Bernard McGrane (born  1947) is an American sociologist, author, and Associate Professor of Sociology at Chapman University's Wilkinson College of Humanities & Social Sciences in Orange, California. He received a BA in 1969 from Fairfield University, and a Ph.D. in 1976 from New York University. for a thesis . "Beyond Europe : an archaeology of anthropology from the sixteenth to the early twentieth century"

Career
McGrane has authored numerous books, including The Un-TV and the 10 MPH Car, This Book is Not Required: An Emotional Survival Manual for Students, and Beyond Anthropology, Society and the Other.

He also wrote and was featured in a DVD on the hidden messages of advertisements in The Ad and the ID: Sex, Death, and Subliminal Advertising

Beginner's Mind

Bernard McGrane has championed the idea in Sociology of exercising the beginner's mind. This idea was adopted from the Zen Buddhist custom of Shoshin. The concept of "beginner's mind" suggests that sociology should view the world without presuppositions, thus bringing new insight into the field. Those preconceptions are the impediments that prevents us to take part in the world as a whole.

Publications

McGrane, Bernard, and John Gunderson. Watching TV Is Not Required: Thinking About Media and Thinking About Thinking. New York: Routledge, 2010. 
Bell, Inge, and Bernard McGrane. This Book Is Not Required: An Emotional Survival Manual for Students. Thousand Oaks, Calif: Pine Forge Press, 1999.
Review by Frank B Varney; Inge Bell; Teaching Sociology, Jan., 2000, vol. 28, no. 1, p. 90-92
McGrane, Bernard. The Un-TV and the 10 Mph Car: Experiments in Personal Freedom and Everyday Life. Fort Bragg, Calif: The Small Press, 1994.  
Review, by Raymond Rymph;  Teaching Sociology, Apr., 1995, vol. 23, no. 2, p. 183-184
McGrane, Bernard. Beyond Anthropology: Society and the Other. New York: Columbia University Press, 1989.  In 480 American libraries according to 
Review, by Jiri Kolaja The Annals of the American Academy of Political and Social Science, Jan., 1991, vol. 513, p. 195
Review, by Peter H HareThe Journal of American History, Sep., 1990, vol. 77, no. 2, p. 635-636
Review, by Elvi Whittake Anthropologica, 1990, vol. 32, no. 1, p. 128-129
Review, by Robert Deliège Man, Jun., 1994, vol. 29, no. 2, p. 490-491
Review by Sydney R Story American Anthropologist, Sep., 1990, vol. 92, no. 3, p. 813-814
Review by Elizabeth A Williams The American Historical Review, Oct., 1991, vol. 96, no. 4, p. 1156–1157

See also
 Shoshin

References

External links
  Wilkinson College, biography and publications

American sociologists
1947 births
Living people
Fairfield University alumni